Li Xinliang (born November 1936) is a general (shangjiang) of the People's Liberation Army (PLA). He was a member of the 13th and 15th Central Committee of the Chinese Communist Party. He was a representative of the 14th National Congress of the Chinese Communist Party. He was a delegate to the 9th National People's Congress and a member of the Standing Committee of the 10th National People's Congress.

Biography
Li was born in Laiyang County (now Laiyang), Shandong, in November 1936. He enlisted in the People's Liberation Army (PLA) in August 1953, and joined the Chinese Communist Party (CCP) in October 1956.

After graduating from the PLA Nanjing Engineering School in 1956, he was assigned to the 41st Group Army, where he was promoted to a division commander in 1980. He was commander of Guangxi Military District in May 1983, and held that office until February 1988, when he was appointed deputy commander of Guangzhou Military Region. In December 1993, he was made political commissar of Shenyang Military Region, and served until September 1995, when he was commissioned as commander. In December 1997, he became commander of Beijing Military Region, serving in the post until January 2003. In March 2013, he was appointed vice chairperson of the National People's Congress Supervisory and Judicial Affairs Committee.

He was promoted to the rank of major general (shaojiang) in 1988, lieutenant general (zhongjiang) in 1993 and general (shangjiang) in 1998.

References

1936 births
Living people
People from Laiyang
Commanders of the Shenyang Military Region
Commanders of the Beijing Military Region
People's Liberation Army generals from Shandong
People's Republic of China politicians from Shandong
Chinese Communist Party politicians from Shandong
Delegates to the 9th National People's Congress
Members of the Standing Committee of the 10th National People's Congress
Members of the 13th Central Committee of the Chinese Communist Party
Members of the 15th Central Committee of the Chinese Communist Party